Janet Lee Shearer (born 17 July 1958) is a New Zealand sailor who competed for New Zealand at three Olympic Games and won a silver medal, with Leslie Egnot, at the 1992 Summer Olympics in Barcelona, in the women's 470 class.

Shearer and Egnot finished second in the 1989 470 Class World Championships in Japan, she was part of the New Zealand crew that won the 1990 World Women's Match Racing Championships in New York; Jan Shearer and Fiona Galloway competed for New Zealand at the 1988 Summer Olympics in Seoul in the 470W Class, this was the first time ever that women had their own event in sailing at the Olympic Games. They finished 9th overall. Shearer and Galloway also won the centennial (100 year anniversary) of 'Kiel Week' Germany in the 470W Class, in one of the largest fleets ever in women's dinghy sailing. Shearer and Egnot competed again at 1996 Summer Olympics in Atlanta finishing 16th. Their competitiveness was hampered by an injury Egnot was carrying at the time.

She later married fellow international yachtsman Murray Jones, a six-time America's Cup-winning sailor and designer, and five-time New Zealand Olympian. She commentated for TVNZ and Team New Zealand VIPs during the 1995, 2000 and 2003 America's Cups; and completed a Master of Business Studies (Management of Sport, Honors) at Massey University in 2002. while working as an engineer. Her daughter, Gemma, is a sailor and competed at the 2016 Summer Olympics.

Born in Dunedin in 1958, Shearer was educated at Otago Girls' High School and is a life member of Yachting NZ and Takapuna Boating Club. She was appointed to the Tennis NZ Board in 2012, in 2016 Shearer was elected to the board of Snow Sports NZ, and in 2017 to the Board of Canoe Racing NZ and Melanoma NZ. She spent 20 years working as an engineer, 5 years as Head of Performance at Tennis NZ and then 3 years as CEO of Snow Sports NZ.

References 

1958 births
Living people
New Zealand female sailors (sport)
Sailors at the 1988 Summer Olympics – 470
Sailors at the 1992 Summer Olympics – 470
Sailors at the 1996 Summer Olympics – 470
Olympic sailors of New Zealand
Olympic silver medalists for New Zealand
Sportspeople from Dunedin
Olympic medalists in sailing
People educated at Otago Girls' High School
Medalists at the 1992 Summer Olympics
Massey University alumni
New Zealand sports executives and administrators